Lee Mo-gae is a South Korean and an Asia Pacific Screen Award-winning cinematographer known for his work in A Tale of Two Sisters, Traces of Love, The Good, the Bad, the Weird, and many other films.

Filmography
 Illang: The Wolf Brigade (2018)
 Asura: The City of Madness (2016)
No Tears for the Dead (2014)
Way Back Home (2013)
My Way (2011)
I Saw the Devil (2010)
Secret Reunion (2010)
The Good, the Bad, the Weird (2008)
Traces of Love (2006)
April Snow (2005)
The Wolf Returns (2004)
Springtime (2004)
A Tale of Two Sisters (2003)

External links

Living people
South Korean cinematographers
Year of birth missing (living people)